Songs from the Back of a Van is a compilation album by Dave House of B-sides, covers, alternate versions and remixes. The album was made to order on pre-order only, and was used to raise money for House's US tour.

Track listing
 "You Are On My Frequency" (Single Version)
 "Death & Taxes" (Kid Dynamite Cover)
 "Medicine" (Original Home Demo)
 "Souvenir" (Cable Cover)
 "See That No One Else Escapes" (Alternate Version)
 "A Song For" (Get Cape. Wear Cape. Fly Cover)
 "Since Yesterday" (Strawberry Switchblade Cover, featuring Jenny Owen Youngs)
 "Bacchus & Bridges" (Live at The Peel 8 February 2005)
 "The Same Place" (First Ever Solo Demo from 1997)
 "Kingston's Current" (Rough Demo)
 "You Are On My Frequency" (BHP Un-finished Funk RMX)
 "Gallery" (Dave House remix of Tellison)
 "Prego Triangolos" (Dave House remix of Dartz!)

External links
Page on BanquetRecords.com

2008 compilation albums
Folk compilation albums